The 1915–16 Irish Cup was the 36th edition of the premier knock-out cup competition in Irish football. 

Linfield won the tournament for the 12th time and the 2nd consecutive year, defeating Glentoran 1–0 in the final.

Results

First round

|}

1 Linfield were awarded victory after Belfast United played an ineligible player.

Quarter-finals

|}

Replay

|}

Semi-finals

|}

Final

Replay

References

External links
 Northern Ireland Cup Finals. Rec.Sport.Soccer Statistics Foundation (RSSSF)

Irish Cup seasons
1916 domestic association football cups
1915–16 in Irish association football